Edna Irene Watson MCP (1895 – 1976) with Hilda Aitken was one of the first two female members of the colonial parliament of Bermuda. She represented the Paget parish from 1948 to 1953 after a campaign by The Women's Suffrage Society for her election to the House of Assembly.

References

1895 births
1976 deaths
Bermudian women in politics
20th-century British women politicians